The 2017–18 EHF Champions League group stage began on 13 September 2017 and concluded on 4 March 2018. A total of 28 teams competed for 14 places in the knockout stage of the 2017–18 EHF Champions League.

Draw
The draw for the group stage was held on 30 June 2017.

Seedings
The seedings were announced on 27 June 2017.

Format
In each group, teams played against each other in a double round-robin format, with home and away matches. After completion of the group stage matches, the teams advancing to the knockout stage were determined in the following manner:

Groups A and B – the top team qualified directly for the quarter-finals, and the five teams ranked 2nd–6th advanced to the first knockout round.
Groups C and D – the top two teams from both groups contested a playoff to determine the last two sides joining the 10 teams from Groups A and B in the first knockout round.

Tiebreakers
In the group stage, teams were ranked according to points (2 points for a win, 1 point for a draw, 0 points for a loss). After completion of the group stage, if two or more teams have scored the same number of points, the ranking was determined as follows:

Highest number of points in matches between the teams directly involved;
Superior goal difference in matches between the teams directly involved;
Highest number of goals scored in matches between the teams directly involved (or in the away match in case of a two-team tie);
Superior goal difference in all matches of the group;
Highest number of plus goals in all matches of the group;
If the ranking of one of these teams is determined, the above criteria are consecutively followed until the ranking of all teams is determined. If no ranking can be determined, a decision shall be obtained by EHF through drawing of lots.

During the group stage, only criteria 4–5 apply to determine the provisional ranking of teams.

Groups
The matchdays were 13–17 September, 20–24 September, 27 September–1 October, 4–8 October, 11–15 October, 1–5 November, 8–12 November, 15–19 November, 22–26 November, 29 November–3 December 2017. For Groups A and B, additional matchdays included, 7–11 February, 14–18 February, 21–25 February and 28 February–4 March 2018.

Group A

Group B

Group C

Group D

Playoffs

The top two teams from Groups C and D contested a playoff to determine the two sides advancing to the knockout phase. The winners of each group faced the runners-up of the other group in a two-legged tie. The first leg was played on 24 February 2018 and the second leg on 4 March 2018.

|}

Matches

References

External links
Official website

Group stage